
This is a list of aircraft in alphabetical order beginning with 'Hf – Hz'.

Hf – Hz

HFB 
(Hamburger Flugzeugbau GmbH)
 HFB 209
 HFB 314
 HFB 320 Hansa Jet

HFL-Flugzeugbau
 HFL Stratos 300

Hickman 
(Orville H Hickman, Minneapolis, MN)
 Hickman H-16
 Hickman H-20
 Hickman H-22
 Packmag Midget Seaplane

Hidde 
(Leo A Hidde, Milwaukee, WI)
 Hidde LH-1

Higgins 
((Andrew J & Frank O) Higgins Industries Inc, New Orleans, LA)
 Higgins EB-1 Rotorplane

Higgins 
(J H Higgins, Bunkburnett, TX)
 Higgins H-2

Higley 
(Clarence Higley, Cummings, KS)
 Higley Parasol

Higher Class Aviation 
 Higher Class Aviation Sport Hornet

Hild-Marshonet 
((Frederick C) Hild-(Edward F) Marshonet, Hempstead, NY)
 Hild-Marshonet 1911 Monoplane
 Hild-Marshonet 1912 Trainer
 Hild-Marshonet 1919 Biplane
 Hild-Marshonet 1920 Biplane

Hill
 Hummer

Hill 
(Topeka, KS)
Hill Tomcat

Hill 
(John Hill, Enid, OK)
Hill Tiny Hawk

Hill-Kemman 
(Keith Hill and Roger Kemman)
 Hill-Kemman HK-1

Hillberg
(Hillberg Helicopters, Fountain Valley, CA)
 Hillberg Turbine Exec
 Hillberg EH1-01 RotorMouse
 Hillberg EH1-02 TandemMouse

Hiller 
(Stanley Hiller (Sr), Alameda, CA)
 Hiller 1911 monoplane

Hiller 
(1942: (Stanley) Hiller Industries, Berkeley, CA, 1944: United Helicopters Inc (Hiller & Henry J Kaiser), 625 El Camino Real, Palo Alto, CA, c.1952: Hiller Helicopters. 1961: Acquisition by Eltra Corp, a holding company. 1964: Fairchild-Hiller Corp. 1973: Hiller Aviation. 1984: Fairchild-Hiller assets sold to Rogerson Aircraft Corp as Rogerson-Hiller, Port Angeles, WA, 1994: Hiller Aircraft Corp, Newark, CA, established when Jeffrey Hiller (son of Stanley) led an investment consortium to repurchase the assets from Rogerson-Hiller Corp.)
Hiller H-5
Hiller OH-23 Raven
Hiller YH-32 Hornet
Hiller XH-44
Hiller HO-1
Hiller HO-5
Hiller VJ-100 two-man VTOL jet-rocket aircraft 
Hiller HOE
Hiller HTE
Hiller ROE Rotorcycle
Hiller VZ-1 Pawnee "Flying Platform"
Hiller X-18
Hiller 206
Hiller Model 360 (UH-12)
Hiller 360 (1981)
Hiller autogyro
Fairchild Hiller FH-227
Fairchild Hiller FH-1100
Hiller HJ-1 Hornet
Hiller J-5
Hiller HH-120 Hornet
Hiller 1094 Camel
Hiller Ten99
Hiller UH-4 Commuter
Hiller UH-5B Rotormatic
Hiller UH-12
Hiller VXT-8
Hiller X-2-235
Hiller CH-112 Nomad RCAF

Hillman 
(Hillman Helicopters, Paso Robles, CA and Stellar Airpark, Chandler, AZ)
 Hillman Model 360
 Hillman Busy Bee
 Hillman Hornet
 Hillman Turbo Hornet
 Hillman Wankelbee

Hillson 
(F.H. Hills & Sons)
 Hillson Praga
 Hillson Pennine
 Hillson Helvellyn
 Hillson Bi-mono
 Hillson F.H.40 'Slip-wing Hurricane

Hilton 
(Hilton Aircraft Co, 621 W Douglas, Wichita, KS)
 Hilton & Brown 1000 (a.k.a. Hilton Super)

Hinchman 
(Hinchman Aircraft Company)
 Hinchman H-1 Racer

Hindustan 
(Hindustan Aeronautics Limited or HAL, India)
 HAL G-1
 HAL HT-2
 HAL HJT-16 Kiran
 HAL HJT-16 Kiran Mk II
 HAL HF-24 Marut
 HAL HUL-26 Pushpak
 HAL HAOP-27 Krishak
 HAL HAL-31 Basant
 HAL HA-31 Mk II Basant
 HAL HPT-32 Deepak
 HAL HTT-34
 HAL HJT-36 Sitara
 HAL HTT-40
 HAL Ardhra
 HAL Dhruv (ALH)
 HAL Tejas (LCA)
 HAL Ajeet
 HAL Ajeet Trainer
 HAL Lancer
 HAL Rudra 
 HAL ALH-WSI
 HAL Light Utility Helicopter

Hinkler
 Hinkler Ibis

Hino 
(Kumazo Hino)
 Hino No.1 
 Hino No.2
 Hino No.3 Kai
 Hino No.4 Kamikaze-go

Hinz
(L and B Hinz, Filderstadt, Germany)
 Hinz BLT-ARA
 Hinz BL-1 Kea

Hipp's Superbirds 
 Hipp's Superbirds J-3 Kitten
 Hipp's Superbirds J-4 Sportster
 Hipp's Superbirds J-5 Super Kitten
 Hipp's Superbirds Super Sportster
 Hipp's Superbirds Reliant
 Hipp's Superbirds Reliant SX

Hippsich 
 Hippsich Monoplane

Hirosho 
(Hiro Kaigun Kosho - Hiro Naval Arsenal)
 Hiro G2H
 Hiro H1H
 Hiro H2H
 Hiro H3H
 Hiro H4H
 Hiro H10H 
 Hiro Navy Experimental 7-Shi Attack Bomber
 Hiro Navy Experimental 14-Shi Medium Flying-Boat
 Hiro Navy Type 15 Flying-Boat
 Hiro Navy Type 89 Flying-Boat
 Hiro Navy Type 90-1 Flying-Boat
 Hiro Navy Type 91 Flying-Boat
 Hiro Navy Type 91 Night Reconnaissance Flying Boat
 Hiro Navy Type 95 Twin-engined Land-based Attacker
 Hiro Navy F.5 Flying Boat
 Hiro Experimental R-3 Flying Boat

Hirsch 
(Rene Hirsch – M.Aé.R.C. Moyens Aérodynamiques de Régulation et de Controle)
 Hirsch H-100

Hirt 
(Hirt Aircraft Corp, Hemet, CA)
 Hirt MK-7
 Hirt Trio

Hirtenberg 
 Hirtenberg HS.9
 Hirtenberg HS.10
 Hirtenberg HA.11
 Hirtenberg HAM.11
 Hirtenberg HV.12
 Hirtenberg HM.13
 Hirtenberg HH.15
 Hirtenberg HV.15
 Hirtenberg HS.16

Hirth 
 Hirth Hi-20 MoSe
 Hirth Hi 27 Acrostar

Hise 
((Fred H) Hise Aircraft Co, Gratiot Ave Airport, Detroit, MI)
 Hise Model A
 Hise Air Rambler C-2

Hispano 
(Sociedad la Hispano / Hispano Aviación)
 Hispano-Barrón
 Hispano E-30
 Hispano E-34
 Hispano HS-34
 Hispano HS-42
 Hispano HA-43
 Hispano HA-100-E1 Triana
 Hispano HA-110-C1
 Hispano HA-200 Saeta
 Hispano HA-220 Super Saeta
 Hispano HA-231-R1 Guión
 Hispano HA-300
 Hispano HA-1109-J1L
 Hispano HA-1109-K1L Tripala
 Hispano HA-1109-M1L
 Hispano HA-1110-K1L
 Hispano HA-1110-M1L
 Hispano HA-1111-K1L
 Hispano HA-1112-M1L Buchon
 Hispano HA-1112-M4L

Historical 
(Historical Aircraft Corporation, Nucla, CO)
 Historical P-51 Mustang
 Historical F4U Corsair
 Historical P-40C Tomahawk
 Historical PZL P.11c
 Historical Ryan STA

Hitachi 
 Hitachi TR.1
 Hitachi T.2

Hatfield Man Powered Aircraft Club (HMPAC)
Hatfield Puffin
Hatfield Puffin II

Hobbycopter 
(Adams-Wilson Helicopters Inc, Lakewood, CA)
 Hobbycopter 101 (a.k.a. XH-1)
 Hobbycopter 102

Hochart
 Hochart S2

Hockaday 
((Noel R) Hockaday Aircraft Corp, Burbank, CA)
 Hockaday Noelcraft
 Hockaday CF-130 Comet

Hocke
 Hocke experimental biplane

Hocker-Denien 
(A Hocker, Evansville, IN; 1961: Ralph R Denien, Indianapolis, IN)
 Hocker-Denien Sparrow Hawk

Hodek
 Hodek HK-101

Hodgdon 
(L M (and T A?) Hodgdon, Detroit, MI)
 Hodgdon Ascender
 Hodgdon Chummy

Hodgson 
(Edward R Hodgson IV, 125 S Millodge, Athens, GA)
 Hodgson Red Star

Hodkinson 
(Valley Mfg Div, (W W) Hodkinson Aircraft Corp, Glendale, CA)
 Hodkinson HT-1

Hoefelman 
(Charles D Hoefelman, Mineral Wells, TX)
 Hoefelman CH-1 Schatzie

Hoff 
(Joseph Hoff, CA)
 Hoff 1921 Biplane

Hoff 
(C D Hoff, Chicago, IL)
 Hoff Cabin

Hoffman 
(Raoul J Hoffman, St Petersburg, FL)
 Hoffman Flying Wing

Hoffman 
(Edward C Hoffman, St Petersburg, FL)
 Hoffman X-1 Sweet Patootie
 Hoffman X-2 Orphan Annie
 Hoffman X-3 The Girl Friend
 Hoffman X-4 Mullet Skiff

Hoffmann 
(Wolf Hoffmann)
 Hoffmann H36 Dimona
 Hoffmann H38 Observer
 Hoffmann H40
 Hoffmann Visionar

Hogan-Moyer 
((Robert J) Hogan-(Jarrett G) Moyer Aircraft Corp, 226 Wolf St, Syracuse, NY)
 Hogan-Moyer Homer

Hogdon 
(L M & T A Hogdon, Detroit, MI)
 Hogdon Ascender
 Hogdon Chummy

Hogue 
(Alton H Hogue, Boulder, CO)
 Hogue H-100

Holbrook 
((Arthur Erritt) Holbrook Helicopter Aeroplane Co (Pres: L B Durnil), Joplin, MO)
 Holbrook 1910 Helicopter

Holcomb 
(Jerry Holcomb, Vancouver, WA)
 Holcomb Perigee

Holeka 
(W J Holeka, Sacramento, CA)
 Holeka Type Z

Holl 
(Fred T Holl, Parkesburg, PA)
 Holl 1920 Biplane

Hollaender
(Arne Hollaender, Aare, Jutland)
 Hollaender A.H.1

Hollandair 
 Hollandair HA-001 Libel

Hollandsche Vliegtuigenfabriek 
 Hollandsche Vliegtuigenfabriek Avia

Holle
(A.A. Holle)
 Holle Varioplane

Holleville 
(Roger Holleville)
 Holleville RH.1 Bambi

Hollman 
(Winther-Hollman Aircraft Inc, Cupertino, CA)
 Hollman Condor
 Hollman HA-2M Sportster

Holloway & Wallace 
(H H Holloway & A J Wallace, Los Angeles, CA)
 Holloway & Wallace HB-2

Hollsmidt 
 Hollsmidt 222
 Hollsmidt HT-1

Holman 
(C B and Clarence T Holman, Rawlins, WY)
 Holman 1930 Monoplane

Honda 
(Honda Motor Co, Greensboro, NC)
 Honda MH01
 Honda MH02
 Honda HA-420 HondaJet

Honey 
(Ray Honey, Bourbonnais, IL)
 Honey Li'L Honey

Hongdu 
 Hongdu JL-8
 Hongdu JL-10
 Hongdu L-15
 Hongdu N-5
 Hongdu Yakovlev CJ-7

Hongxing

Hønningstad 
 Hønningstad Norge A (1938)
 Hønningstad Norge B (1946)
 Hønningstad Norge C (1960)
 Hønningstad C.5 Polar (a.k.a. Norge)
 Norsk Flyindustri C.5 Polar (1948)
 Norsk Flyindustri Finnmark 5A (1949)
 Hønningstad 5A Finnmark

Honroth 
(Edward Honroth)
 Honroth Special

Höntsch
(Gerhard Winkler / Johannes Höntsch / Flugsportgruppe Schönhagen)
 Höntsch FSS 100 Tourist

Hooten 
((Orval M) Hooten Aircraft Co, Springfield, IL)
 Hooten HT-1

Hoover
(David Hoover)
 Hoover AR-6 (Arnold AR-6)

Hopfner 
(Flugzeugbau Hopfner GmbH)
 Hopfner S.1
 Hopfner HV-2
 Hopfner HV-3/27
 Hopfner HV-4/28
 Hopfner HS-5/28
 Hopfner HV-6/28
 Hopfner HS-8/28
 Hopfner HS-8/29
 Hopfner HS-9/32
 Hopfner HS-9/35
 Hopfner HS-10/32
 Hopfner HS-10/33
 Hopfner HS-10/35
 Hopfner HA-11/33
 Hopfner HV-12/34
 Hopfner-Hirtenberger HM.13/34
 Hopfner HR-14/34
 Hopfner HV 15

Hopkins 
(Robert S Hopkins, Reidsville, NC)
 Hopkins Falcon 1

Hopkins & Meade 
(W F Hopkins & T A Meade, San Diego, CA)
 Hopkins & Meade Sport

Hopper 
(Bruce Hopper, Dallas, TX)
 Hopper Grasshopper

Hoppi-copter 
(1945: Hoppi-copters Inc (Fdr: Horace T Pentecost), Boeing Field, Seattle, WA, 1954: Capital Helicopter Corp.)
 Hoppi-copter 101
 Hoppi-copter 102
 Hoppi-copter Firefly

Hordern-Richmond
(Hordern-Richmond aircraft Ltd.)
 Hordern-Richmond Autoplane

Horn 
(Mark V Horn, West Palm Beach, FL)
 Horn Li'L Trouble

Horten 
 Horten H.I
 Horten H.Ib
 Horten H.II
 Horten H.III
 Horten H.IV
 Horten H.V
 Horten H.VI
 Horten H.VII
 Horten H.VIII
 Horten H.IX
 Horten H.X
 Horten H.XI
 Horten H.XIII
 Horten H.XIV
 Horten H.XV
 Horten H.XVa
 Horten H.XVb
 Horten H.XVc
 Horten H.XVI
 Horten H.XVIII
 Horten Parabola
 Horten Ho 226 H.VII; later 8-254; number 8-226 transferred to Focke-Wulf
 Horten Ho 229 H.IX
 Horten Ho 250 H.III
 Horten Ho 251 H.IVc
 Horten Ho 252 H.V
 Horten Ho 253 H.VI
 Horten Ho 254 H.VII; originally numbered 8-226
 Horten Ho 267 Horten Twin-turbojet all-wing aircraft; possibly identical or related to Ho/Go 229 and/or Go 267

Horten
(Horten Aircraft GmbH)
 Horten Aircraft HX-2

Horton 
(William E Horton, Santa Ana, CA)
 Horton Wingless

Horváth
(Ernő Horváth)
 Horváth III 1911 monoplane

Hoshino 
(Yonezo Hoshino)
 Hoshino 1914 Aeroplane

Hosler 
(Russell A "Curly" Hosler, Huntington, IN)
 Hosler C&G Special
 Hosler Fury

Houde
(Patrice Houde, Reichshoffen, France)
Houde Bimax
Houde Speedmax

Houstee 
(Richard & Katherine Houstee, Memphis, TN)
 Houstee Blackhawk

Hovey 
(Robert W. Hovey)
 Hovey Whing Ding
 Hovey Whing Ding II
 Hovey Beta Bird
 Hovey Delta Bird
 Hovey Delta Hawk
 Hovey Super Delta Hawk

Howard 
(Howard aircraft Corporation)
 Howard C-70 Nightingale
 Howard DGA-1
 Howard DGA-2
 Howard DGA-3 Pete
 Howard DGA-4 Mike, Ike and  "Miss Chevrolet"
 Howard DGA-5 orig. Lincoln Playboy later Mike
 Howard DGA-6 Mr. Mulligan
 Howard DGA-7
 Howard DGA-8
 Howard DGA-9
 Howard DGA-11
 Howard DGA-12
 Howard DGA-15
 Howard DGA-18
 Howard Flyabout
 Howard GH
 Howard NH

Howard 
((D U) Howard Aero Inc, San Antonio, TX, 1963: Acquired by Alamo Aero Service as Howard Aero Mfg Co, Div of Business Aircraft Corp.)
 Howard 250
 Howard 350
 Howard 500
 Howard Eldorado 700
 Howard Super Ventura
 Howard Tri-motor Travel Air (Tri-motor Travel Air conv.)

Howard Wright 
 Howard Wright 1909 Monoplane
 Howard Wright 1910 Monoplane

Howell 
(Tyler Howell, Jonesville, MI)
 Howell S

Howell 
(Phil Howell, Christiansburg, VA)
 Howell-Mignet HM-293 Himmelslaus

Howell-Lutzky 
(W T Howell & Victor Lutzky, Detroit, MI)
 Howell-Lutzky 1936 Monoplane

Howland 
(Howland Aero Design, DeBary, FL)
 Howland H-2 Honey Bee
 Howland H-3 Pegasus
 Howland HP-40 Warhawk

Hoyle 
 Hoyle Skyraider

Hoynik 
(Steve W Hoynik, Milwaukee, WI)
 Hoynik Butch BA-11

HPK 
(HPK Aircraft Associates (Harold Hayden, Art Payne, and Robert Kinney of Engle Flying Service), Delaware Valley, PA)
 HPK SP-1

Hruby 
(J Hruby, Riverwoods, IL)
 Hruby Cayuse

HTM 
(Helikopter Technik München)
 HTM Skytrac
 HTM Skyrider

Huabei
(Huabei Machinery Factory)
 Huabei-5
 Huabei-6

Hubertec
(Aach, Rhineland-Palatinate, Germany)
Hubertec Thermik

Hübner
( Dr. Hugo Hübner)
 Hübner Mücke
 Hübner 1911 biplane
 Hübner 1911 monoplane
 Hübner 1912 floatplane
 Hübner Eindecker IV 1912

Huc-Raynaud-Guiraud 
(Alfred Huc – André Raynaud – Charles Guiraud)
 Huc-Raynaud-Guiraud Lou Riatou

Hudson 
(Sandy Hudson Jr, Black Mountain, NC)
 Hudson 2-2-E Thing
 Hudson Trimotor

Hudson 
(Sanders V Hudson & William B Harris, Black Mountain, NC)
 Hudson 32 (a.k.a. Harris & Hudson Longster)

Hudson & O'Brien 
(John W. Hudson & Clifton O'Brien, San Francisco, CA)
 Hudson & O'Brien 1909 Monoplane
 Hudson & O'Brien 1910 Biplane

Huey-Bulmer 
(R V Huey and John W Bulmer, Valley Center, KS)
 Huey-BulmerBuluey Sport H-2

Huff-Daland 
(Huff-Daland Airplane Co, Bristol, PA)
 Huff-Daland AT-1
 Huff-Daland AT-2
 Huff-Daland B-1
 Huff-Daland HB-1
 Huff-Daland HN
 Huff-Daland HO
 Huff-Daland LB-1
 Huff-Daland LB-3
 Huff-Daland LB-5
 Huff-Daland TA-2
 Huff-Daland TA-6
 Huff-Daland TW-5
 Huff-Daland D-49
 Huff-Daland Duster
 Huff-Daland HD-1 Early Bird
 Huff-Daland HD-4 Bridget 
 Huff-Daland HD-5 Petrel
 Huff-Daland HD-7 Dizzy Dog
 Huff-Daland HD-8 Plover
 Huff-Daland HD-8A Petrel 1
 Huff-Daland HD-8A Petrel 4
 Huff-Daland HD-8A Petrel 5
 Huff-Daland HD-9A
 Huff-Daland HD-9L
 Huff-Daland HD-22
 Huff-Daland Pelican
 Huff-Daland Petrel 31
 Huff-Daland TW-8 (Company designation)

Hüffer 
(Flugzeugbau Julius Hüffer)
 Hüffer Hb 28b
 Hüffer HK 39
 DLFW-B.I
 DLFW-B
 DLFW-W.I
 Hüffer HE 1
 Hüffer HS 3
 Hüffer H 9

Huffman 
(Glen Huffman Aircraft Co, Detroit, MI)
 Huffman 1928 Biplane

Hughes 
(C A Hughes Jr, Elon College, NC)
 Hughes Dixie special

Hughes 
(George Andrew Hughes, 1507 Garfield St (dba King of Flight Aircraft Co, 3830 Touzalin Ave), Lincoln, NE)
 Hughes 1893

Hughes Aircraft, Hughes Helicopters 
(1934: (Howard R) Hughes Development Co, Glendale, CA, 1936: Hughes Aircraft Div, Hughes Tool Co, Culver City, Burbank, CA, 1948: Aircraft Div, Hughes Tool Co. 1972: Hughes Helicopters Div, Summa Corp. 1984: Helicopter Div acquired by McDonnell-Douglas.)

 Hughes A-37
 Hughes F-11
 Hughes OH-6 Cayuse
 Hughes H-17 Sky Crane
 Hughes H-28
 Hughes TH-55 Osage
 Hughes AH-64 Apache
 Hughes HO-2
 Hughes HO-6
 Hughes P-73
 Hughes R-11
 Hughes V-9
 Hughes 77 Apache
 Hughes 200
 Hughes 300
 Hughes 500
 Hughes 530F
 Hughes D-2
 Hughes H-1 Special
 Hughes H-4 Hercules
 Hughes Model 269
 Hughes Model 369
 Hughes Model 385
 Hughes XF-11

Hughes
Australian Lightwing GR 532
Australian Lightwing GR 582
Australian Lightwing GR 912
Australian Lightwing SP-2000 Speed
Australian Lightwing SP-4000 Speed
Australian Lightwing SP-6000
 Hughes Lightwing R55
 Hughes Lightwing Aeropower 28

Hugo 
(Adolph B Hugo, Tulsa, OK)
 Hugo Hu-Go Craft

Hulbert 
(Dane Hulbert)
 Hulbert 1910 Biplane

Humber 
(designed by Hubert Le Blon)
 Humber monoplane

Humbert Aviation 
(Jean-Jacques Humbert)
 Humbert Tetras
Humbert La Moto Du Ciel

Hummel 
((J Morry) Hummel Aviation, Bryan, OH)
 Hummel Bird
 Hummel H5
 Hummel Ultracruiser
 Hummel Ultracruiser Plus

Hungaro Copter
(Hungaro Copter Limited)
 Hungaro Copter

Hunt 
(A E Hunt, Jetmore, KS)
 Hunt 1910 Helicopter

Hunt 
(Bill Hunt, Moneta, Los Angeles, CA)
 Hunt Racer
 Hunt Special

Hunt 
((Henry) Hunt Aircraft Mfg Co, Fiskeville, RI)
 Hunt Chummy
 Hunt Special

Hunt
(John Hunt, Govilon, United Kingdom)
 Huntwing

Hunt-Rettig 
(Ralph V Hunt & William Rettig, Kansas City, MO)
 Hunt-Rettig Special

Hunter 
(Charles Hunter, Chicago, IL)
 Hunter SA-3

Hunting Aircraft
 Hunting H.126

Hunting-Percival 
 Hunting-Percival P.56 Provost
 Hunting-Percival P.66 Pembroke
 Hunting-Percival P.66 President
 Hunting-Percival P.66 Sea Prince
 Hunting-Percival P.66 Prince
 Hunting Percival P.74
 Hunting-Percival P.84 Jet Provost

Huntington 
((Howard) Huntington Aircraft Co Inc, New York, NY)
 Huntington 1914 Multiplane
 Huntington 1915 Biplane
 Huntington 1917 Biplane
 Huntington HD-11
 Huntington H-11 Governor
 Huntington H-11K Governor
 Huntington HD-12 Chum (a.k.a. H-12)

Huntington 
(Huntington Airplane Co, Huntington, WV)
 Huntington 1920 Biplane

Hunt
(John Hunt)
 Huntwing

Hurd 
(E P Hurd Co, Aeronautic Div, 5820 Fischer Ave, Detroit, MI)
 Hurd 1928 Monoplane
 Hurd HM-1

Hurel-Dubois
(Avions Hurel-Dubois)
 Hurel-Dubois HD.10
 Hurel-Dubois HD.31
 Hurel-Dubois HD.32
 Hurel-Dubois HD.321
 Hurel-Dubois HD.324
 Hurel-Dubois HD.33
 Hurel-Dubois HD.331
 Hurel-Dubois HD.34
 Hurel-Dubois HD.35
 Hurel-Dubois HD.37

Hürkus
(Vecihi Hürkus)
 Vecihi K-VI
 Vecihi XIV
 Vecihi XV
 Vecihi XIVD
 Vecihi XVI
 Vecihi XVID
 Vecihi K-XVII

Hurlburt 
(Mildred Caldwell, Margaret Hurlburt, Anna Logan, Cleveland, OH)
 Hurlburt Hurricane (a.k.a. Camburt Special)

Hurry 
(LeRoy Hurry)
 Hurry J-1 Sport

Hurst 
((J W) Hurst Aeroplane & Motor Co (Pres: I J O'Malley), Terre Haute, IN)
 Hurst Papillon

Husk 
(Bill Husk, Dublin, GA)
 Husk The Clip

Husky 
(Caribbean Traders Inc, Miami, FL)
 Husky I
 Husky II
 Husky III
 Husky Bush Plane

Hussey
(J.G.H. Hussey, Calgary Alberta, Canada)
 Hussey Skyhawk 101

Hutchinson 
(Hutchinson Aircraft Co, Bay St Louis, MS)
 Hutchinson AGMaster

Hütter 
(Ulrich Hütter and Wolfgang Hütter)
 Hütter Hü 17
 Hütter Hü 28
 Hütter Hü 136
 Hütter Hu 211

Hy-Tek Hurricane 
 Hy-Tek Hurricane 103

References

Further reading

External links

 List of Aircraft (Hf-Hz)

fr:Liste des aéronefs (E-H)